School Student Union of Norway (SSUN or EO) is a Norwegian student rights organisation. The organization is politically independent and has (as of May 2014) around 400 member schools, in which there are over 170,000 students. It is organized nationally by a central organ and has a county board in all of the 11 counties, all operated by students themselves. It is currently the only organization of its kind in Norway and has the slogan "By, with and for students".

SSUN was founded in 1959 and is responsible for the Operation Day's work campaign in Norway. It has been held since 1964.

Leaders 
 2022-2023: Aslak
 2021-2022: Edvard Botterli Udnæs
 2020-2021: Kristin Schultz
 2019-2020: Alida De Lange D'Agostino
 2018-2019: Agathe Brautaset Waage
 2017-2018: Rahman Akhtar Chaudhry
 2016-2017: Sylvia Helene Lind
 2015-2016: Kristoffer Hansen
 2014-2015: Benjamin Skiaker Myrstad
 2013-2014: Liv Holm Heide
 2012-2013: Axel Fjeldavli
 2011-2012: Andreas Borud
 2010-2011: Anna Holm Heide
 2009-2010: Ingrid Liland 
 2008-2009: Håvard Vederhus
 2007-2008: Vibeke Mohn Herberg
 2006-2007: Jan Christian Vestre
 2005-2006: Halvard Hølleland
 2004-2005: Solveig Tesdal
 2003-2004: Sigve Indregard
 2002-2003: Robert Terdal Moe
 2001-2002: Jan Fredrik Stoveland
 2000-2001: Martin Nielsen
 1999-2000: Thomas Aasberg Rasmussen

Sources 
Official website

Education in Norway
Student organisations in Norway